Frances Drake (born Frances Morgan Dean; October 22, 1912 – January 18, 2000) was an American actress best known for playing Eponine in Les Misérables (1935).

Early years
Drake was born in New York City as Frances Morgan Dean to a wealthy family. She was educated at Havergal College in Canada and at age 14 "she was sent to school in England, under her grandmother's wing." She was there when the stock market crashed in 1929.

Career
Needing to make money for the first time in her life, Drake became a dancer and stage actress and found that film paid even better. In 1933, she explained: "I met an actor in London – Gordon Wallace, who was in Eva Le Gallienne's repertory company for a while – and he asked me to form a dance team with him. We danced, and a stage producer asked us to take parts in a play. Then I was invited to make films in England."

She returned to the United States in 1934 and was offered a contract by Paramount, which changed her name to Frances Drake (after the studio initially wanted her new name to be Marianne Morel to avoid confusion with the then-popular star Frances Dee). She was coached by opera singer and actress Marguerite Namara while continuing in film. She was often typecast in "damsel in distress" roles and appeared in proto-horror and proto-sci-fi films opposite stars like Bela Lugosi, Boris Karloff, and Peter Lorre. One film reference book summed up Drake's career as follows: "She played leads in many Hollywood productions of the '30s, often as the terrified heroine of horror and mystery tales."

Personal life
On February 12, 1939, Drake married Cecil Howard (1908–1985), second son of Henry Howard, 19th Earl of Suffolk. Howard disapproved of her career, and she retired from the screen when he received his inheritance. After Howard's death in 1985, she married David Brown in 1992; he died in 2009.

Recognition
She has a star in the Motion Picture section of the Hollywood Walk of Fame, located at 6821 Hollywood Boulevard.

She has a school named after her in Leominster, Massachusetts.

Death
Drake died in Irvine, California, on January 18, 2000, aged 87. She is interred in Section 8 Garden of Legends in the Hollywood Forever Cemetery, Hollywood, California.

Filmography

 The Jewel (1933) - Jenny Day/Lady Joan
 Meet My Sister (1933) - Helen Sowerby
 Bolero (1934) - Leona
 The Trumpet Blows (1934) - Chulita
 Ladies Should Listen (1934) - Anna Mirelle
 Forsaking All Others (1934) - Connie Barnes Todd
 Transient Lady (1935) - Dale Cameron
 Les Miserables (1935) - Eponine
 Mad Love (1935) - Yvonne Orlac
 Without Regret (1935) - Mona Gould
 The Invisible Ray (1936) - Diana Rukh
 The Preview Murder Mystery (1936) - Peggy Madison
 Florida Special (1936) - Marina Landon
 And Sudden Death (1936) - Betty Winslow
 I'd Give My Life (1936) - Mary Reyburn
 Midnight Taxi (1937) - Gilda Lee
 You Can't Have Everything (1937) - Pamela Beaumont
 She Married an Artist (1937) - Sally Dennis
 Love Under Fire (1937)
 There's Always a Woman (1938) - Anne Calhoun
 The Lone Wolf in Paris (1938) - Princess Thania of Arvonne
 It's a Wonderful World (1939) - Vivian Tarbel
 I Take This Woman (1940) - Lola Estermont
 The Affairs of Martha (1942) - Sylvia Norwood (final film role)

References

External links

 
 
 
 Photographs of Frances Drake

Actresses from New York City
American film actresses
Actors from Orange County, California
1912 births
2000 deaths
Burials at Hollywood Forever Cemetery
Howard family (English aristocracy)
20th-century American actresses
Havergal College alumni